Royal Air Force Wendling or RAF Wendling is a former Royal Air Force station located  north west of East Dereham, Norfolk, England.

Opened in 1942 it was used by both the Royal Air Force (RAF) and United States Army Air Forces (USAAF).  During the war it was used primarily as a bomber airfield, being the home of the United States Army Air Forces Eighth Air Force 392nd Bombardment Group.

After the war, it was used by the RAF as a standby airfield before being finally closed in 1961 and returned to agriculture. With the end of military control the airfield has become a turkey farm.

History
RAF Wendling (Wendling airfield) was originally planned for RAF Bomber Command use, however in 1942 was assigned as a United States Army Air Forces heavy bomber installation. It was the most northerly placed of Eighth Air Force heavy bomber fields and was built by Taylor-Woodrow Ltd in 1942.

Another twenty hardstands (loop type) were added to the thirty of the frying-pan type when the airfield was rescheduled as an Eighth Air Force heavy bomber station.  Two T2-type hangars were provided plus the usual full technical facilities, Mark II airfield lighting and dispersed accommodation for some 2,900 persons.  The domestic sites were in the parish of Beeston to the west of the airfield and the bomb dump and ammunition stores were in Honeypot Wood to the south-east.

United States Army Air Forces use
Under USAAF control, RAF Wendling was designated as Station 118.

392nd Bombardment Group (Heavy)
The airfield was opened in 1943 and was used by the 392d Bombardment Group (Heavy), arriving from Alamogordo Army Airfield, New Mexico in the south west of the US, on 18 July 1943. The 453rd was assigned to the 14th Combat Bombardment Wing, and the group tail code was a "Circle-D".

Its operational squadrons were:
 576th Bombardment Squadron (CI).
 577th Bombardment Squadron (DC).
 578th Bombardment Squadron (EC).
 579th Bombardment Squadron (GC).

The group flew Consolidated B-24 Liberators as part of the Eighth Air Force's strategic bombing campaign.

The 392d BG entered combat on 9 September 1943 and engaged primarily in bombardment of strategic objectives on the Continent until April 1945.  The group attacked such targets as an oil refinery at Gelsenkirchen, a marshalling yard at Osnabrück, a railroad viaduct at Bielefeld, steel plants at Brunswick, a tank factory at Kassel, and gas works at Berlin.

The group took part in the intensive campaign of heavy bombers against the German aircraft industry during Big Week, 20 – 25 February 1944, being awarded a Distinguished Unit Citation (DUC) for bombing an aircraft and component parts factory at Gotha on 24 February.  The unit sometimes supported ground forces or carried out interdictory operations along with bombing airfields and V-weapon sites in France prior to the Normandy invasion in June 1944 and struck coastal defences and choke points on D-Day.

The group hit enemy positions to assist ground forces at Saint-Lô during the breakthrough in July 1944.  Bombed railroads, bridges, and highways to cut off German supply lines during the Battle of the Bulge, December 1944 – January 1945.  Dropped supplies to Allied troops during the air attack on Holland in September 1944 and during the airborne assault across the Rhine in March 1945.

The 392nd Bomb Group flew its last combat mission on 25 April 1945, then carried food to the Dutch. The unit returned to Charleston Army Airfield South Carolina, in the north east of the USA on 25 June 1945 and was inactivated on 13 September 1945.

Royal Air Force use
When the Americans left, Wendling RAF was returned to the Air Ministry and transferred to RAF Maintenance Command and was used by No. 258 Maintenance Unit RAF as a stand-by airfield, later becoming an inactive station before being finally closed on 22 November 1961. The airfield was also home to No. 4249 Anti-Aircraft Flight RAF Regiment.

It was used between June 1960 and April 1964 by the United States Air Force as a radio facility before being finally closed and sold in 1964.

Current use
With the end of military control the airfield has become a turkey farm, with large coops built along its runways.  Most of the buildings and hardstands have been torn down and the concrete removed. Also much of the perimeter track has been reduced to a single lane road.

A granite obelisk monument to the men of the 392nd Bomb Group and stands well maintained and cared for in a small plot just off the airfield on the road to Beeston. The monument was dedicated in September 1945.

See also

List of former Royal Air Force stations

References

Citations

Bibliography

 Freeman, Roger A. (1991) The Mighty Eighth: The Colour Record. Cassell & Co.

External links

 Wendling Airfield Photo Gallery
 392d Bomb Group Website
 Wendling @ www.b24.net
 mighty8thaf.preller.us Wendling 
 USAAS-USAAC-USAAF-USAF Aircraft Serial Numbers—1908 to present

Airfields of the VIII Bomber Command in Norfolk
Royal Air Force stations in Norfolk